Katie McMahon is an Irish singer. She was a soloist with the original Riverdance troupe. Her recordings have largely featured traditional Irish songs, occasionally in the Irish language.

Originally from Dublin, McMahon studied Italian and Drama Studies at Trinity College, Dublin. During a break from her studies, Katie joined the vocal group Anúna in 1991, and remained with the choir until 1996. She was a soloist on Anúna's first three CDs "ANÚNA" (1993), "Invocation" (1994) and "Omnis" (1995).

Classically trained in voice and harp, McMahon is best known as the original lead soprano soloist with Anúna in the piece "Cloudsong". This is the opening section of Riverdance, first performed as part in the 1994 Eurovision Song Contest. Subsequently, she went on to participate with Anúna in the offshoot stage performance "Riverdance: The Show". While Anúna left Riverdance in 1996, McMahon remained with the show as a soloist until the late 1990s.

Her debut album, After the Morning, was released in North America. Since then she has released four more albums: Shine, Celtic Christmas, St. Patrick's Day, and Christmas Angels.

She is married with two children and lives in Minnesota in the United States.

References

External links 
 KatieMcMahon.com – Official website

Irish women singers
Irish harpists
Musicians from Dublin (city)
Living people
Year of birth missing (living people)